Australia at the 1934 British Empire Games was abbreviated AUS. This was their second of 2 Commonwealth Games meets.

Medallists

1934 Australian Team & Results

Athletics
100 yards
 Howard Spencer Yates - 6th (heat 10.1, semi 10.1)
 Jack C Horsfall - 3rd (heat)
 Noel Dempsey - 4th (heat)

220 yards
 Jack C Horsfall -3rd (heat 6)
 Noel Dempsey - 4th, 22.9 (semi)
 Howard Spencer Yates - 5th, 22.4 (semi)

440 yards
 H Wilton Lander - 3rd (heat)

880 yards
H Wilton Lander - 4th (heat)

440 yards Hurdles
 Charles P Reilly - Silver, 55.5 sec

Hop, Step, Jump
 John Patrick 'Jack' Metcalfe - Gold, 51 ft 31/2 in (GR)

Broad Jump
 John Patrick 'Jack' Metcalfe - Silver, 22 ft 9 in

High Jump
 John Patrick 'Jack' Metcalfe - 4th, 6 ft 2 in

Pole Vault
 Frederick Irvine Woodhouse - Bronze, 12 ft 3 in

4x110 yards Relay
 Noel Dempsey - 4x100 yards Relay - 4th
 Jack C Horsfall - 4x110 yards Relay - 4th
 H Wilton Lander - 4x110 yards Relay - 4th
 Howard Spencer Yates - 4x110 yards Relay - 4th

Bowls
 E W Walker - singles - 6th
 T M Rainer - pairs - 9th
 J Banks - pairs - 9th
 C Gale - fours/rinks - 9th
 H Langley - fours/rinks - 9th
 William White - fours/rinks - 9th
 Sir Henry Barwell - fours/rinks - 9th

Boxing
Lightweight (up to 60 kg)
 Leonard Arthur Cook - Gold

Cycling
Time Trial
 Edgar Laurence 'Dunc' Gray - Gold, 1:16.4 (GR)

10 miles
 Edgar Laurence 'Dunc' Gray - Did not finish
 Horrace James Pethybridge - Did not finish

1,000 yards Sprint
 Horrace James Pethybridge - Silver

Swimming
100 yd Freestyle
 Reginald Vaughan Clark

100 yd Backstroke
 Reginald Vaughan Clark

3x110 yd Medley Relay
 Reginald Vaughan Clark - 4th, 3:16.8
 Alan Edward Higginson - 4th, 3:16.8
 Noel Phillip Ryan - 4th, 3:16.8

200 yd Breaststroke, Men
 Alan Edward Higginson - 4th, 2:44.8

200 yd Breaststroke, Women
 Clare Dennis - Gold, 2:50.2 (GR)

440 yd Freestyle
 Noel Phillip Ryan - Gold, 5:03.0 (GR)

1,500 yd Freestyle
 Noel Phillip Ryan - Gold, 18:25.4 (GR)

Diving
Springboard
 Lesley Julia Thompson - Silver, 60.49 points

Platform
 Lesley Julia Thompson - Silver, 27.64 points

Wrestling
Lightweight (up to 68 kg)
 Richard Edward 'Dick' Garrard - Gold

Heavyweight (up to 100 kg)
 John Lambert 'Jack' Knight - Gold

Officials
Honorary Manager Herbert Krause Maxwell (NSW)
Hon Chaperone - Millicent Isabel Watson (VIC)

See also
 Australia at the 1932 Summer Olympics
 Australia at the 1936 Summer Olympics

References

External links
Commonwealth Games Australia Results Database

1934
Nations at the 1934 British Empire Games
British Empire Games